Dispur College ( Assamese: দিশপুৰ মহাবিদ্যালয়) is an institution for higher education located in Guwahati, Assam, India, established in 1978. The college is affiliated to Gauhati University. The college offers  bachelor's degree courses in arts and commerce as well as in computer application (BCA) and business administration (BBA).

References

External links
 http://www.dispurcollege.ac.in/

Universities and colleges in Guwahati
Colleges affiliated to Gauhati University
Educational institutions established in 1978
1978 establishments in Assam
Dispur